Pearson's Weekly was a British weekly periodical founded in London in 1890 by Arthur Pearson, who had previously worked on Tit-Bits for George Newnes.

The first issue was well advertised and sold a quarter of a million copies. The paper's stated aim was "To Interest, to Elevate and to Amuse".

Notable fiction published
George Griffith, The Angel of the Revolution: A Tale of the Coming Terror (1893)
George Griffith, The Syren of the Skies (1894)
H. G. Wells, The Invisible Man (1897)
M. P. Shiel, Contraband of War (1898)
Sax Rohmer, The Mysterious Mummy (1903)
Rupert Croft-Cooke, "The Legacy" (1932)
William Edward Vickers, The Rubber Truncheon (1934)
Ethel Lina White, "Honey" (1935)

Further reading
George Locke, Pearson's Weekly: A Checklist of Fiction, 1890–1939 (Ferret Fantasy, 1990)

See also
 Pearson's Magazine

Notes

External links
Pearson's Weekly at britishnewspaperarchive.co.uk
1890 establishments in the United Kingdom
1939 disestablishments in the United Kingdom
Weekly magazines published in the United Kingdom
Defunct literary magazines published in the United Kingdom
Fiction magazines
Magazines established in 1890
Magazines disestablished in 1939
Magazines published in London